Sir Roslyn Foster Bowie Philp KBE (27 July 1895 – 19 March 1965) was appointed as a judge to the Supreme Court of Queensland, which is the highest ranking court in the Australian State of Queensland.  He served as a puisne judge 4 May 1939 until 8 February 1956.  He served as a senior puisne judge from 9 February 1956 until his death in March 1965.

Philp's father was the journalist and author James Philp.

See also
 Judiciary of Australia
 List of Judges of the Supreme Court of Queensland

References

The ancestry of Sir Roslyn Foster Bowie Philp
The Bowie/Philp Story tracing the family from Scotland to Australia via New Zealand.

Judges of the Supreme Court of Queensland
1965 deaths
Australian Knights Commander of the Order of the British Empire
1895 births